Pseudancistrus zawadzkii is a species of catfish in the family Loricariidae. It is native to South America, where it occurs in the Tapajós basin, including the Tracuá River, in Brazil. It is typically found in areas with clear water, rocky outcrops, small waterfalls, and a substrate of rocks and sand. The species reaches 12.9 cm (5.1 inches) SL. 

P. zawadzkii was described in 2014 by Gabriel S. C. Silva, Fábio F. Roxo, and Claudio Oliveira (all of São Paulo State University), as well as Ricardo Britzke (of the National University of San Marcos). Its specific epithet, zawadzkii, refers to Cláudio Henrique Zawadzki, a professor at the State University of Maringá, honoring his contributions to the study of Loricariidae.

P. zawadzkii sometimes appears in the aquarium trade, where it is typically known either as the Tapajós stream pleco or by its associated L-number, which is L-321.

References 

Loricariidae
Fish described in 2014
Catfish of South America
Fish of Brazil